There are currently more than 47,000 ethnic Poles living in the Russian Federation. This includes autochthonous Poles as well as those forcibly deported during and after World War II; the total number of Poles in what was the former Soviet Union is estimated at up to 3 million.

History

1652, Smolensk Boyars from Polish-Lithuanian Commonweath 
Zainsk, Kazan governate, was originally a fort occupied by Chelny strelsty, archers and servicemen, and 81 Polish Cossask prisoners from Smolensk area after the Polish Lithuanian Commonwealth.

1654, Polotsk Gentry from Polish-Lithuanian Commonweath 
In 1654 the Poles were taken from Polotsk, 141 people from the Polish small gentry were evacuated to Tiinsk together with the Cossacks, who, before that, "universal servants of Polish kings carried serfdom". Another party of the Polish gentry was settled in the settlement of Old Kuvak [Старой Куваке] and Old Pismyanka [Старой Письмянке] of the future Bugulma district [Бугульминского уезда], Kazan governate. They became part of the Simbirsk Line. Polish gentry until 1830 were considered available soldiers for conscription or draft.

1768 – The Bar Confederation and the Polish–Lithuanian Commonwealth

Many Poles were exiled to Siberia, starting with the 18th-century opponents of the Russian Empire's increasing influence in the Polish–Lithuanian Commonwealth (most notably the members of the Bar Confederation).

Tsarist Russia until 1917

After the change in Russian penal law in 1847, exile and penal labor (katorga) became common penalties to the participants of national uprisings within the Russian Empire. This led to increasing number of Poles being sent to Siberia for katorga, they were known as Sybiraks. Some of them remained there, forming a Polish minority in Siberia. Most of them came from the participants and supporters of the 19th century November Uprising and January Uprising, the participants of the 1905–1907 unrest to the hundreds of thousands of people deported in the Soviet invasion of Poland in 1939.

Originally, 148 Polish exiles were stationed in the Orenburg province, but by the beginning of June 1864, 278 people had been sent to the Orenburg governate to take up residence under the supervision of the police, and by mid-1865, 506 people. In addition, 831 people were identified for establishment on the state lands of the Orenburg and Chelyabinsk districts, of which 754 people were allocated to Ufa.

There were about 20,000 Poles living in Siberia around the 1860s. An unsuccessful uprising of Polish political exiles in Siberia broke out in 1866.

In the late 19th century there was also a limited number of Polish voluntary settlers, attracted by the economic development of the region. Polish migrants and exiles, many of whom were forbidden to move away from the region even after finishing serving their sentence, formed a vibrant Polish minority there. Hundreds of Poles took part in the construction of the Trans-Siberian Railway. Notable Polish scholars studied in Siberia, among them Aleksander Czekanowski, Jan Czerski, Benedykt Dybowski, Wiktor Godlewski, Sergiusz Jastrzebski, Edward Piekarski, Bronisław Piłsudski, Wacław Sieroszewski, Mikołaj Witkowski and others.

In the Soviet Union

Millions of Poles lived within the Russian Empire as the Russian Revolution of 1917 started followed by the Russian Civil War. While some Poles associated with the communist movement, the majority of the Polish population saw cooperation with Bolshevik forces as betrayal and treachery of Polish national interests. Marian Lutosławski and his brother Józef, the father of the Polish composer Witold Lutosławski, were murdered in Moscow in 1918 as "counter-revolutionaries". Stanisław Ignacy Witkiewicz lived through the Russian Revolution in St. Petersburg, which had a profound effect on his works, many of which displayed themes of the horrors of social revolution. Famous revolutionaries with Polish origins include Konstantin Rokossovsky, Julian Marchlewski, Karol Świerczewski and Felix Dzerzhinsky, founder of the Cheka secret police which would later turn into the NKVD. However, according to their ideology they did not identify as Poles or with Poland, and members of the communist party viewed themselves as Soviet citizens without any national sentiments. The Soviet Union also organized Polish units in the Red Army and a Polish Communist government-in-exile.

In modern Russia
There were 73,000 Polish nationals living in Russia according to the 2002 Russian Census. This includes autochthonous Poles as well as those forcibly deported during and after World War II; the total number of Poles in what was the former Soviet Union is estimated at up to 3 million. The number of Polish people in Russia was 47,125 in 2010.

Gallery

Notable people of Polish-Russian descent 

Aleksandr Verzhbilovich, classical cellist
Wladyslaw Grzegorz Branicki, senator and general
Adam Jerzy Czartoryski, statesman, diplomat and author. Foreign Minister of the Russian Empire (1804–1806)
Alexander Rzewuski, general.
Sofya Kovalevskaya, mathematician who made noteworthy contributions to analysis, partial differential equations and mechanics.
Dmitri Shostakovich, composer and pianist. 
Catherine I of Russia, Empress of Russia
Konstantin Tsiolkovsky, Russian and Soviet rocket scientist and pioneer of the astronautic theory.
Nikolay Raevsky, Russian general and statesman who achieved fame for his feats of arms during the Napoleonic Wars. 
Sigizmund Levanevsky, Soviet pioneer of long-range flight who was awarded the title Hero of the Soviet Union in 1934 for his role in the SS Chelyuskin rescue.
Jan Nagórski, engineer and pioneer of aviation, the first person to fly an airplane in the Arctic and the first aviator to perform a loop with a flying boat.
Stanisław Kosior, First Secretary of the Ukrainian Communist Party, deputy prime minister of the USSR and member of the Politburo of the Communist Party of the Soviet Union (CPSU).
Felix Dzerzhinsky, Bolshevik and Director of Cheka
Vyacheslav Menzhinsky Bolshevik revolutionary, a Soviet statesman and Party official who served as chairman of the OGPU from 1926 to 1934.
Józef Unszlicht, Bolshevik revolutionary activist, one of the founders of the Cheka and Soviet government official.
Gleb Krzhizhanovsky, Soviet Scientist، revolutionary and a state figure as well as a geographer and writer.
Mathilde Kschessinska, ballerina and lover of Nicholas II of Russia
Nikolai Lobachevsky, mathematician and geometer
Kazimir Malevich, painter
Robert Rozhdestvensky, Soviet-Russian poet and Songwriter who broke with socialist realism in the 1950s–1960s during the Khrushchev Thaw.
Nikolay Lossky, Russian Empire philosopher, representative of Russian idealism, intuitionist epistemology, personalism, libertarianism, ethics and axiology (value theory). 
Vaslav Nijinsky, ballet dancer
Nikolay Przhevalsky, geographer
Konstantin Rokossovsky, Marshal of the Soviet Union and Marshal of Poland
Fyodor Stravinsky, bass opera singer and actor
Igor Stravinsky, composer and pianist
Dmitri Torbinski, footballer
 Mikhail Brin, father of Russian-American inventor Sergey Brin
Yanina Zhejmo, Soviet actress
Aleksander Waszkiewicz  – Soviet military officer
Aniela Krzywoń, the only woman in history who was not a citizen of the Soviet Union to be awarded the USSR's highest honor for bravery, the title Hero of the Soviet Union.
 Vikenty Veresaev (birth name Smidovich) – writer
Vatsalv Vorovsky (Wacław Worowski) – revolutionary, one of the first Soviet diplomats and head of the state publishing house 
 Mechislav Kozlovsky – communist diplomat and lawyer
 Yury Olesha – writer
 Tomasz Dąbal – communist politician
 Karol Świerczewski – general, commander of the Polish Second Army during the fighting for western Poland and the Battle of Berlin
 Stanislav Poplavsky (Stanisław Popławski) – general, commander of the Polish First Army during the breakthrough of the Pommernstellung (Pomerania Wall) fortification line, securing the Baltic Sea coast, crossing the Odra and Elbe rivers and the battle of Berlin
 Andrey Vyshinsky (Andriej or Andrzej Wyszyński) – Prosecutor General of the USSR (1934–1939), the legal mastermind of Joseph Stalin's Great Purge
 Arseny Tarkovsky (Tarkowski) – poet and translator (with a father of Polish descent)
 Andrei Tarkovsky (Tarkowski) – film-maker, writer, film editor, film theorist, theatre and opera director (with a paternal grandfather of Polish descent)
 Dmitri Shostakovich (Szostakowicz) – composer (with a paternal grandfather of Polish descent)
 Rostislav Plyatt – actor (of mixed Polish-Ukrainian descent)
 Mstislav Rostropovich – cellist and conductor 
 Edvard Radzinsky – playwright, TV personality
 Edita Piekha (Edyta Piecha) – singer, born in France, moved to USSR
 Anatoly Sobchak – mayor of Saint Petersburg (mixed Russian-Ukrainian-Polish-Czech descent)
 Sergey Yastrzhembsky (Jastrzębski) – Russian politician, President Vladimir Putin’s chief spokesperson on the Second Chechen War, head of the Kremlin’s Information Policy Department, co-ordinating Putin administration's external communications.
 Konstantin Petrzhak – physicist
 Vladislav Strzhelchik – Soviet and Russian actor.
 Osip Kozlovsky – composer
 Vatslav Dvorzhetsky – Soviet film and theater actor. People's Artist of the RSFSR (1991).
 Anatoly Kubatsky – Soviet stage and film actor.
 Mikhail Vrubel – Painter
   Skarzhinsky, Nikolai Georgievich - Russian Major General (1849-1910).
   Skarzhinsky, Vasily Anastasievich - Russian Major General
   Skarzhinsky, Pyotr Mikhailovich - Major General, Cavalier of the Order of St. Vladimir of the 2nd degree and the Order of St. George of the 4th degree. Commander of the Astrakhan Cossack Regiment. He participated in the Russo-Turkish War of 1768-1774 and the Russo-Turkish War of 1787-1791
   Skarzhinsky, Nikolai Petrovich - lieutenant of the Izmailovo regiment, mortally wounded at Kulm (August 17, 1813), his name is listed on the wall of the Cathedral of Christ the Savior in Moscow.
   Skarzhinsky, Nikolai Vladimirovich (1910-1990) Soviet serviceman, who served in the Soviet 327th anti-tank battalion of the 253rd Rifle Division, was awarded the Order "For Courage" and the Order of Glory of the 3rd degree during the Great Patriotic War.

See also 

Poland–Russia relations
Poles in Kaliningrad
Russian minority in Poland

References

Ethnic groups in Russia
Ethnic Poles in Russia and the Soviet Union
 
Russia
+